In physical geography, tundra is a type of biome where tree growth is hindered by frigid temperatures and short growing seasons. The term tundra comes through Russian  from the Kildin Sámi word  meaning "uplands", "treeless mountain tract". There are three regions and associated types of tundra: Arctic tundra, alpine tundra, and Antarctic tundra.

Tundra vegetation is composed of dwarf shrubs, sedges, grasses, mosses, and lichens. Scattered trees grow in some tundra regions. The ecotone (or ecological boundary region) between the tundra and the forest is known as the tree line or timberline. The tundra soil is rich in nitrogen and phosphorus. The soil also contains large amounts of biomass and decomposed biomass that has been stored as methane and carbon dioxide in the permafrost, making the tundra soil a carbon sink. As global warming heats the ecosystem and causes soil thawing, the permafrost carbon cycle accelerates and releases much of these soil-contained greenhouse gases into the atmosphere, creating a feedback cycle that increases climate change.

Arctic  

Arctic tundra occurs in the far Northern Hemisphere, north of the taiga belt. The word "tundra" usually refers only to the areas where the subsoil is permafrost, or permanently frozen soil. (It may also refer to the treeless plain in general so that northern Sápmi would be included.) Permafrost tundra includes vast areas of northern Russia and Canada. The polar tundra is home to several peoples who are mostly nomadic reindeer herders, such as the Nganasan and Nenets in the permafrost area (and the Sami in Sápmi).

Arctic tundra contains areas of stark landscape and is frozen for much of the year. The soil there is frozen from  down, making it impossible for trees to grow. Instead, bare and sometimes rocky land can only support certain kinds of Arctic vegetation, low-growing plants such as moss, heath (Ericaceae varieties such as crowberry and black bearberry), and lichen.

There are two main seasons, winter and summer, in the polar tundra areas. However, extreme cold temperatures on the tundra do not drop as low as those experienced in taiga areas further south (for example, Russia's and Canada's lowest temperatures were recorded in locations south of the tree line). During the summer, temperatures rise somewhat, and the top layer of seasonally-frozen soil melts, leaving the ground very soggy. The tundra is covered in marshes, lakes, bogs, and streams during the warm months. Arctic tundras are sometimes the subject of habitat conservation programs. In Canada and Russia, many of these areas are protected through a national Biodiversity Action Plan.

Although precipitation is light, evaporation is also relatively minimal. During the summer, the permafrost thaws just enough to let plants grow and reproduce, but because the ground below this is frozen, the water cannot sink any lower, so the water forms the lakes and marshes found during the summer months. There is a natural pattern of accumulation of fuel and wildfire which varies depending on the nature of vegetation and terrain. Research in Alaska has shown fire-event return intervals (FRIs) that typically vary from 150 to 200 years, with dryer lowland areas burning more frequently than wetter highland areas.

The biodiversity of tundra is low: 1,700 species of vascular plants and only 48 species of land mammals can be found, although millions of birds migrate there each year for the marshes. There are also a few fish species. There are few species with large populations. Notable plants in the Arctic tundra include blueberry (Vaccinium uliginosum), crowberry (Empetrum nigrum), reindeer lichen (Cladonia rangiferina), lingonberry (Vaccinium vitis-idaea), and Labrador tea (Rhododendron groenlandicum). Notable animals include reindeer (caribou), musk ox, Arctic hare, Arctic fox, snowy owl, ptarmigan, northern red-backed voles, lemmings, the mosquito, and even polar bears near the ocean. Tundra is largely devoid of poikilotherms such as frogs or lizards.

Due to the harsh climate of Arctic tundra, regions of this kind have seen little human activity, even though they are sometimes rich in natural resources such as petroleum, natural gas, and uranium. In recent times this has begun to change in Alaska, Russia, and some other parts of the world: for example, the Yamalo-Nenets Autonomous Okrug produces 90% of Russia's natural gas.

Relationship to global warming 
A severe threat to tundra is global warming, which causes permafrost to thaw. The thawing of the permafrost in a given area on human time scales (decades or centuries) could radically change which species can survive there. It also represents a significant risk to infrastructure built on top of permafrost, such as roads and pipelines. 

Such events may both result from and contribute to global warming.

Greenhouse gas emissions

Antarctic 

Antarctic tundra occurs on Antarctica and on several Antarctic and subantarctic islands, including South Georgia and the South Sandwich Islands and the Kerguelen Islands. Most of Antarctica is too cold and dry to support vegetation, and most of the continent is covered by ice fields. However, some portions of the continent, particularly the Antarctic Peninsula, have areas of rocky soil that support plant life. The flora presently consists of around 300–400 species of lichens, 100 mosses, 25 liverworts, and around 700 terrestrial and aquatic algae species, which live on the areas of exposed rock and soil around the shore of the continent. Antarctica's two flowering plant species, the Antarctic hair grass (Deschampsia antarctica) and Antarctic pearlwort (Colobanthus quitensis), are found on the northern and western parts of the Antarctic Peninsula.
In contrast with the Arctic tundra, the Antarctic tundra lacks a large mammal fauna, mostly due to its physical isolation from the other continents. Sea mammals and sea birds, including seals and penguins, inhabit areas near the shore, and some small mammals, like rabbits and cats, have been introduced by humans to some of the subantarctic islands. The Antipodes Subantarctic Islands tundra ecoregion includes the Bounty Islands, Auckland Islands, Antipodes Islands, the Campbell Island group, and Macquarie Island. Species endemic to this ecoregion include Corybas dienemus and Corybas sulcatus, the only subantarctic orchids; the royal penguin; and the Antipodean albatross.

There is some ambiguity on whether Magellanic moorland, on the west coast of Patagonia, should be considered tundra or not. Phytogeographer Edmundo Pisano called it tundra since he considered the low temperatures key to restrict plant growth.

The flora and fauna of Antarctica and the Antarctic Islands (south of 60° south latitude) are protected by the Antarctic Treaty.

Alpine 

Alpine tundra does not contain trees because the climate and soils at high altitude block tree growth. The cold climate of the alpine tundra is caused by the low air temperatures, and is similar to polar climate. Alpine tundra is generally better drained than arctic soils. Alpine tundra transitions to subalpine forests below the tree line; stunted forests occurring at the forest-tundra ecotone (the treeline) are known as Krummholz.

Alpine tundra occurs in mountains worldwide. The flora of the alpine tundra is characterized by plants that grow close to the ground, including perennial grasses, sedges, forbs, cushion plants, mosses, and lichens. The flora is adapted to the harsh conditions of the alpine environment, which include low temperatures, dryness, ultraviolet radiation, and a short growing season.

Climatic classification 

The cold limit generally meets the EF climates of permanent ice and snows; the warm-summer limit generally corresponds with the poleward or altitudinal limit of trees, where they grade into the subarctic climates designated Dfd, Dwd and Dsd (extreme winters as in parts of Siberia), Dfc typical in Alaska, Canada, mountain areas of Scandinavia, European Russia, and Western Siberia (cold winters with months of freezing).

Despite the potential diversity of climates in the ET category involving precipitation, extreme temperatures, and relative wet and dry seasons, this category is rarely subdivided. Rainfall and snowfall are generally slight due to the low vapor pressure of water in the chilly atmosphere, but as a rule potential evapotranspiration is extremely low, allowing soggy terrain of swamps and bogs even in places that get precipitation typical of deserts of lower and middle latitudes. The amount of native tundra biomass depends more on the local temperature than the amount of precipitation.

Places featuring a tundra climate 

Alpine tundra
 Gavia Pass, Italy  
 Mount Fuji, Japan
 Cerro de Pasco, Peru
 Apartaderos, Venezuela
 Puno, Peru
 Kasprowy Wierch, Poland
 High Tatras, Slovakia
 Murghob, Tajikistan
 Mount Wellington, Australia
 Cairn Gorm, United Kingdom
 Putre, Chile
 Coranzuli, Argentina
 Yu Shan, Taiwan
 Juf, Switzerland
 Finse, Norway
 Sêrxü, China

Polar tundra
 Longyearbyen, Svalbard, Norway
 Yamal Peninsula, Russia
 Iqaluit, Canada
 Utqiagvik, United States
 Hooper Bay, United States
 Kerguelen Islands, French Southern Lands (France)
 Nuuk, Greenland (Denmark) 
 Grytviken, South Georgia (United Kingdom) 
 Tiksi, Russia
 Mykines, Faroe Islands (Denmark)
 Hveravellir, Iceland
 Tolhuin, Argentina
 Campbell Island, New Zealand

See also 
 Alas
 Fellfield
 List of tundra ecoregions from the WWF
 Mammoth steppe
 Park Tundra

References

Further reading

External links
WWF Tundra Ecoregions 
The Arctic biome at Classroom of the Future
Arctic Feedbacks to Global Warming: Tundra Degradation in the Russian Arctic
British Antarctica Survey
Antarctica: West of the Transantarctic Mountains
World Map of Tundra

 
Terrestrial biomes
Geography of the Arctic
Environment of the Arctic
Köppen climate types
Nearctic realm
Palearctic realm